The Uniqa Classic was a staged cycling race held in Austria. It was created in 1953 and was part of UCI Europe Tour in 2005 as a 2.1 event, but has not been held since. Its main sponsor was insurance company Uniqa, which the race was named after.

Winners

References

Cycle races in Austria
Recurring sporting events established in 1953
Recurring sporting events disestablished in 2005
1953 establishments in Austria
UCI Europe Tour races
2005 disestablishments in Austria
Defunct cycling races in Austria